Maria Martynova (born 25 December 1997) is a Belarusian sports shooter. She competed in the women's 10 metre air rifle event at the 2020 Summer Olympics.

Her father, Sergei, is a 2012 Olympic Champion in the 50 m rifle prone event.

References

External links
 

1997 births
Living people
Belarusian female sport shooters
Olympic shooters of Belarus
Shooters at the 2020 Summer Olympics
Sportspeople from Minsk
European Games competitors for Belarus
Shooters at the 2019 European Games
21st-century Belarusian women